The Sukhoi Su-28 is a downgraded variant of the Su-25UB / Su-25T, with reductions in avionics and aircraft systems, together with the elimination of all weapon-carrying capability. The Su-28 trainer is intended for technical skill, general flight and formation flying training. It is also used as an aerobatic aircraft.

Design and development
The Su-28 is a highly maneuverable and robust aircraft with the ability to perform take-off and landing with only one of its two engines running. The aircraft's engines can also run on a diesel based fuel as opposed to more traditional aviation fuel. Like the MiG-29, it also has the ability to operate from unpaved runways while maintaining high reliability and a low maintenance requirement. In addition, the Su-28 can withstand heavy landings, allowing it to be more forgiving in the training role. Range can be extended by up to four PTB-800 drop tanks, each of 800 L capacity.

Differences between the Su-28 and its parent Su-25UB model include the absence of targeting systems, weapon-operating systems, internal guns, wing pylons (used on military aircraft to mount weaponry such as bombs and missiles). It also lacks armor protection for the engines,  electronic countermeasures and any systems dedicated to ground attack operations.

Operators

Russian Air Force

Specifications (Su-28)

See also

External links

 AirWar.ru

Su-28
1980s Soviet military trainer aircraft
Twinjets
Aircraft first flown in 1987